Ten-pin bowling was featured in the Commonwealth Games official programme in 1998.

Editions

Past winners

All-time medal table

External links
Commonwealth Games sport index

Sports at the Commonwealth Games
Commonwealth Games